Gavin Richard Skelton (born 27 March 1981) is an English football coach, manager, and former professional footballer. As a player, he was primarily deployed as a defensive midfielder. He is the first-team coach of Carlisle United.

Skelton's playing career including a seven-year spell at Gretna as well as stints at Carlisle United, Workington (two spells), Kilmarnock, Hamilton Academical, Barrow and Queen of the South.

Skelton began his managerial career at Workington. After a stint as assistant manager at Queen of the South, Skelton was then manager of the club from April to November 2016.

Playing career
Skelton was born on 27 March 1981, in Carlisle, England. He started his career at Carlisle United as a trainee. In 1997, after three years at Brunton Park he moved to non-League club Workington Reds and one year later joined then Northern Premier League outfit Gretna. Gretna joined the Scottish Football League in 2002, eventually gaining promotion to the Scottish Premier League during the 2006–07 season. In the 2006 Scottish Cup Final versus Hearts, Skelton missed the crucial kick in the penalty shoot-out after a 1–1 draw. His miss denied Gretna their first major trophy, however they still qualified for the UEFA Cup as a result of their run to the final.

Due to Gretna's financial difficulties, in April 2008 it was reported that Skelton was in talks with Kilmarnock and Aberdeen On 19 May 2008, Skelton was one of the remaining 40 staff members who were released by Gretna. Two days earlier, Skelton had scored the winning goal on his side's final SPL fixture against Hearts. In June 2008, Skelton signed for SPL side Kilmarnock but left the club under freedom of contract in June 2010.

After his release from Killie, Skelton signed for Hamilton Academical. He was released by Hamilton following their relegation from the SPL in May 2011 and signed for Barrow on 6 July 2011.

On 22 December 2016, Skelton was tempted back to sign for Scottish League Two club Annan Athletic as a player, after he resigned as player-manager of Queen of the South on 7 November 2016 for personal reasons.

Coaching career
In order to gain coaching and managerial experience, Skelton coached the Stirling University team part-time, whilst playing for Kilmarnock.

Skelton was appointed as the manager of Workington in May 2014, replacing Ian MacDonald. He had joined the Reds as a player-coach in 2013. Skelton led the Borough Park side to the Northern Premier League Play-offs in his only full season in charge, finally falling to Ilkeston in front of 1,500 supporters at Borough Park.

Skelton left Workington in June 2015 to be the assistant manager at Queen of the South in Dumfries. Skelton was appointed caretaker manager of Queens on 18 April 2016 after James Fowler departed the club. Just over a month later, Skelton was appointed Queens player-manager on a permanent basis on 23 May 2016. Skelton resigned from Queens on 7 November 2016 for personal reasons.

Skelton joined Carlisle United as the coach of their academy in May 2017.

On 31 December 2018, Skelton was reappointed manager of Workington, however he resigned in January 2019 after just six days and two games in charge of the club.

On 4 June 2019, Carlisle United announced that they had appointed Skelton as assistant manager. He served as caretaker manager for two games, and signed a contract extension in November 2019.

Personal life
Skelton married Rebecca on 12 June 2015 and the couple had a son during the summer of 2016. They live together in Appleby-in-Westmorland in Cumbria. Skelton's sister, Helen, is a television presenter and broadcaster who formerly worked on the popular children's television programme Blue Peter.

Managerial statistics

References

External links

1981 births
Living people
Footballers from Carlisle, Cumbria
English footballers
Association football midfielders
Carlisle United F.C. players
Workington A.F.C. players
Gretna F.C. players
Kilmarnock F.C. players
Hamilton Academical F.C. players
English Football League players
National League (English football) players
Northern Premier League players
Scottish Premier League players
Scottish Football League players
Barrow A.F.C. players
English football managers
Workington A.F.C. managers
Queen of the South F.C. managers
Northern Premier League managers
Scottish Professional Football League managers
Queen of the South F.C. players
Annan Athletic F.C. players
Carlisle United F.C. non-playing staff
Carlisle United F.C. managers
People educated at Appleby Grammar School